The Emory University Orthopaedics & Spine Hospital is part of the Emory Healthcare system. The hospital is situated in a six-story building at the intersection of Interstate 285 and Lawrenceville Highway in Tucker, Georgia, United States, and is staffed by full-time Emory physicians. The hospital, which does not have an emergency department, specializes in inpatient orthopedics and spine operations.

References 
Emory Healthcare Web site
Emory University Orthopaedics & Spine Hospital Web site

Hospitals in Georgia (U.S. state)
Orthopaedics and Spine Hospital
Buildings and structures in DeKalb County, Georgia
Tucker, Georgia